Catarina is a municipality in the Masaya department of Nicaragua with 4,500 inhabitants.

References

Populated places in Nicaragua
Municipalities of the Masaya Department